The Leathernecks Have Landed is a 1936 American adventure film directed by Howard Bretherton and written by Seton I. Miller. The film stars Lew Ayres, Isabel Jewell, James Ellison, James Burke, J. Carrol Naish and Clay Clement. The film was released on February 17, 1936, by Republic Pictures.

Plot

Cast
Lew Ayres as Woodruff 'Woody' Davis
Isabel Jewell as Brooklyn
James Ellison as Mac MacDonald 
James Burke as Corrigan
J. Carrol Naish as Irenov
Clay Clement as Capt. Halstead
Maynard Holmes as Pvt. 'Tubby' Waters
Ward Bond as Tex
Paul Porcasi as Enrico 'Rico' Venetzi
Claude King as British Agent in Shanghai
Christian Rub as Schooner Captain
Joe Sawyer as Sgt. Regan
Henry Mowbray as British Army Major
John Webb Dillon as Marine Captain
Lal Chand Mehra as Sam

References

External links
 

1936 films
American adventure films
1936 adventure films
Republic Pictures films
Films directed by Howard Bretherton
American black-and-white films
Films about the United States Marine Corps
Films set in Shanghai
1930s English-language films
1930s American films
English-language adventure films